Raiffeisen Superliga 2014–15 is the fifteenth season of top-tier football in Kosovo. The season began on 16 August 2014. Kosova (V) are the defending champions.

A total of 12 teams competed in the league: 10 sides from the 2013–14 season and two promoted from the Liga e Parë campaign. Vëllaznimi,  and Istogu were each demoted from the top flight.

Teams

League table

Results

Matches 1–22

Matches 23–33

Relegation play-offs 
The Relegation play-offs took place on Thursday 11 June 2015. In the draw, Drita drew Flamurtari, while Vëllaznimi drew Gjilani.

External links
 Kosovo Superliga at Soccerway

Football Superleague of Kosovo seasons
Kosovo
1